Rajesh Kumar Singh may refer to:

 Rajesh Kumar Singh (Bihar politician)
 Rajesh Kumar Singh (Uttar Pradesh politician)

See also
 Rajesh Singh (disambiguation)